Robert Lee Linn (June 29, 1938 – December 8, 2015) was an American educational psychologist who has made notable contributions to the understanding of educational assessments. He studied technical and policy issues relating to the application of test data, and the effects of high-stakes testing on teaching and learning. He was a professor emeritus at the University of Colorado, past president of the American Educational Research Association and the National Council on Measurement in Education (NCME), and former editor of the Journal of Educational Measurement. He completed his PhD and MA in educational psychology at the University of Illinois at Urbana-Champaign. From 1965 until 1973, he held positions as a research scientist and later research division director at Educational Testing Service in Princeton, NJ. In 1973, he joined the faculty at the University of Illinois, Champaign-Urbana and in 1987 became a professor at the University of Colorado. Linn died in La Grange Park, Illinois, in December 2015 at the age of 77.

References

1938 births
2015 deaths
20th-century American psychologists
Educational psychologists
University of Illinois alumni
American educational psychologists